Cisthene subjecta, the subject lichen moth, is a moth of the family Erebidae. It was described by Francis Walker in 1854. It is found in the south-eastern United States, where it has been recorded from Alabama, Florida, Georgia, Indiana, Kentucky, Maryland, Mississippi, North Carolina, Oklahoma, South Carolina, Tennessee and Texas.

The wingspan is about 12 mm. Adults have been recorded on wing year round.

References

Cisthenina
Moths described in 1854